is a greatest hits album by AKB48, released on January 1, 2008.

AKB48 had released six albums prior to the release of this album, but those were just a collection of songs each team sang at the AKB48 theater. They are also known as stage albums. This is the first album that they have released as a group. There are 33 tracks in total. However, songs are only recorded up to the 13th track; the rest are 20 members who were chosen to say, "Aitakatta" (wanted to meet you).

Limited edition cover is the back view of Team K member, Megumi Ohori. The first pressing of the Kanzenban edition comes in a cardboard slip cover with a random member photo and an application card.

Track listings

Set List: Greatest Songs 2006-2007 (Regular Edition CD)
DFCL-1431

"Bingo!"

"Dear My Teacher" (Team A Ver.)
 (Album Mix)

"Virgin Love" (Album Mix)

 (Team A)
 (Team K)

Set List: Greatest Songs 2006-2007 (Limited Edition CD+DVD)
DFCL-1429/30

"Bingo!"

"Dear My Teacher" (Team A Ver.)
 (Album Mix)

"Virgin Love" (Album Mix)

 (Team A)
 (Team K)

DVD:
 (Video Clip)
Making of

Set List: Greatest Songs Kanzenban (Re-release CD)
DFCL-1653

"Bingo!"

"Dear My Teacher" (Team A Ver.)
 (Album Mix)

"Virgin Love" (Album Mix)

 (Team A)
 (Team K)

"Seventeen"

Release history

References

AKB48 albums
2008 compilation albums
2008 greatest hits albums
Japanese-language compilation albums
Defstar Records compilation albums